The Iron Trail is a 1921 American silent adventure film directed by Roy William Neill and written by Dorothy Farnum. The film stars Wyndham Standing, Thurston Hall, Reginald Denny, Alma Tell, and Harlan Knight. The film was released on October 30, 1921, by United Artists.

Plot
Competing efforts to build railways into interior Alaska in the early part of the 20th century.

Cast 

Wyndham Standing as Murray O'Neil
Thurston Hall as Curtis Gordon
Reginald Denny as Dan Appleton
Alma Tell as Eliza Appleton
Harlan Knight as Tom Slater
Betty Carpenter as Natalie
Lee Beggs as Dr. Cyrus Gray
Bert Starkey as Denny
Danny Hayes as Linn
Eulalie Jensen as Mrs. Gordon

Preservation
This film is preserved at the Gosfilmofond archive in Moscow.

References

External links 

 
 The AFI Catalog of Feature Films: The Iron Trail
 
Digital twin of the unfinished tunnel

1921 films
American silent feature films
American black-and-white films
United Artists films
Films directed by Roy William Neill
1921 adventure films
American adventure films
Films based on works by Rex Beach
1920s English-language films
1920s American films
Silent adventure films